Raghubar Das (born 3 May 1955) is an Indian politician who served as the sixth Chief Minister of Jharkhand. He was sworn in as the 6th chief minister of Jharkhand on 28 December 2014. He belongs to Bharatiya Janata Party and has twice served as the president of Jharkhand BJP. Currently he is the National Vice President of BJP.

An employee of Tata Steel, he served as the member of legislative assembly five times, he was representing Jamshedpur East since 1995 to 2019. He also served as the Deputy Chief Minister and the Urban Development Minister during the BJP-led government in the state. During internal emergency, he was sent behind the bars. He is the first chief minister of the state to have completed a full term.

Early life
He was born on 3 May 1955 to Chavan Ram, a labourer with a steel company, at TMH Hospital Jamshedpur. He belongs to the Teli caste. He passed matriculation from Bhalubasa Harijan High School, and completed B.Sc. from Jamshedpur Cooperative College. He also studied law from the same college and acquired LLB degree. After studies, he joined Tata Steel as a legal professional. He is a former RSS functionary.

Political career
Das was involved in politics since his college days. He participated in Jayprakash Narayan-led  Total Revolution movement in the state. He was arrested and imprisoned in Gaya and was again imprisoned during the Emergency imposed by Indira Gandhi. Subsequently, Das joined the Janata Party in 1977.

Later he joined Bharatiya Janata Party (BJP) as a founding member in 1980. He participated in the first National Committee meeting of BJP in Mumbai in 1980. He was appointed the chief of unit of Sitaramdera in Jamshedpur. Later he served as the city chief secretary and the vice president of Jamshedpur, BJP secretary and then became the vice president.

He was elected as the member of Bihar Legislative Assembly in 1995 from Jamshedpur East. He again won from the same constituency five times. He was appointed a chief of BJP in Jharkhand in 2004. The BJP won 30 seats in Jharkhand Legislative Assembly election, 2005. He also served as the Urban Development Minister during the NDA government in 2005 under Arjun Munda as the chief minister. He also led the 2009 Indian general election in the state. He held the office of Deputy Chief Minister of Jharkhand state from 30 December 2009 to 29 May 2010, when Shibu Soren was the chief minister.

He was also appointed the vice president in the National Committee of BJP on 16 August 2014. He has shown assets to the tune of around Rs. 21 lakh. When BJP secured majority in 2014 Jharkhand Legislative Assembly election, he became the sixth and the first non-tribal chief minister of the state on 28 December 2014.

In the 2019 Jharkhand Legislative Assembly election  elections held in December, BJP under his leadership managed to win only 25 seats out of 81 assembly seats against the JMM alliance and had to resign. He lost to Saryu Rai, an ex-leader of BJP, who was an independent candidate from the Jamshedpur east constituency with more than 15,000 votes.

Notes

References

External links
 Raghubar Das affidavit

Living people
1955 births
Chief Ministers of Jharkhand
Deputy chief ministers of Jharkhand
People from Jamshedpur
Indians imprisoned during the Emergency (India)
Chief ministers from Bharatiya Janata Party
Bharatiya Janata Party politicians from Jharkhand
Bihar MLAs 1995–2000
Jharkhand MLAs 2000–2005
Jharkhand MLAs 2005–2009
Jharkhand MLAs 2009–2014
Jharkhand MLAs 2014–2019
People from Rajnandgaon